Sam Christie (born 26 September 1986) is a New Zealand rugby union footballer who regularly plays as a fly-half.

Born in Tokoroa to Australian parents, Christie has represented New Zealand Schoolboys, Waikato Development, Waikato Under 20 and Bay of Plenty Under 23. He made his senior debut for  during the 2006 season and has played 33 games and scored 15 points for his province.

Having been overlooked by all of the Super Rugby franchises in his homeland, Christie agreed to join the Western Force ahead of the 2013 Super Rugby season where he will form part of the Extended Playing Squad.

References

External links 
 Sam Christie itsrugby.co.uk Player Statistics

Living people
1986 births
New Zealand rugby union players
Rugby union fly-halves
Rugby union players from Tokoroa
New Zealand people of Australian descent
Western Force players
Waikato rugby union players
Benetton Rugby players
New Zealand expatriate rugby union players
New Zealand expatriate sportspeople in Italy
Expatriate rugby union players in Italy
People educated at Hamilton Boys' High School
Skyactivs Hiroshima players